Tao ExDOS is an emulator software application designed to allow users of old MS-DOS applications to run these applications on new operating systems such as Windows 10, Windows 8, Windows 7, Windows Vista, Windows XP, Windows 2000, and Windows Terminal Server.

Features
Tao ExDOS enables users of DOS applications to work with these applications on new operating systems. Using the built-in Virtual 8086 mode of the x86 CPU, Tao ExDOS enables DOS and 16-bit Windows applications (that run under DOS) to run effectively in 32-bit Windows desktop environments, including Windows 10/8/7/Vista/XP/2000 and Windows Terminal Server 2003/2008. Support for 64-bit systems is available on Windows 7 via the Virtual XP Mode, which can be downloaded for free from Microsoft for Windows 7 Professional, Ultimate and Enterprise versions.

Additional modules allow the DOS users to print to printers connected to USB ports, network printers, fax printers, PDF, Microsoft Word, HTML and image files.

See also
 DOSBox

References

External links
Tao Software Development Company website
Tao ExDOS product page
PC Magazine Encyclopedia article 
Tao ExDOS on CNET Download.com
Tao ExDOS on Tucows Downloads

Emulation software
DOS emulators